The Arab Baths in Ceuta Spain are medium size medieval public baths on the northern edges of the Medina quarter. This is thought to have been occupied since the 11th century. Archaeological investigations in 2000 and 2004 have shown that the baths had one room for clothes and toilets followed by a cold bath and then a hot bath in a style laid down by the Romans. Other rooms may have existed.

History
The earliest occupation on this site in the northern suburbs of Ceuta's Medina quarter date from the 11th century when remains have been found of a street and domestic construction. It was not until the 12th and 13th century that the two baths were built.  Archaeological investigations have shown that the baths had one room for clothes and toilets followed by a cold bath and then a hot bath in a style laid down by the Romans. Some of the barrel vault ceilings have survived by there is evidence that other rooms were constructed but they have since been lost. The building was extended in the 14th century but by the 15th the building was having its stones reused for other projects. It is thought that the arched roofs were once covered in marble. The building was not being used in the 17th century.

The baths were discovered during building work on the street  and they have since been subject to excavations in 2000 and 2004. the remains are open to the public. They appear incongruous on the modern main road in Ceuta.

The baths were recognised as a nationally important monument in 2007.

References

Buildings and structures in Ceuta
Former public baths
Bien de Interés Cultural landmarks in Ceuta
Marinid architecture
Public baths in the Arab world